East Asian Judo Championships is the Judo East Asian Championship organized by the Judo Union of Asia.

The tournament began in 2006 and was held every years, except in the years when the East Asian Games have been held.

List Tournaments

All-time medal table

References

External links 
Judo Union of Asia
East Asian Games Gochang - Event
East Asian Games 2013, Event Medals-Judo

 
Asian Championships, East

Judo